Harmon Sweatland Conger (April 9, 1816 – October 22, 1882) was a U.S. Representative from New York.

Life and career
Born in Freetown, Cortland County, New York, Conger attended the local academy at Cortland in 1833.  He studied law with Horatio Ballard, was admitted to the bar in 1844 and commenced practice in Cortland, New York.

Conger was also editor and owner of a newspaper, the Cortland County Whig, from 1840 to 1845.

He was elected as a Whig to the Thirtieth and Thirty-first Congresses, serving from March 4, 1847 to March 3, 1851.  After his term in Congress, Conger resumed the practice of law in Cortland.

He moved to Janesville, Wisconsin in 1855 and continued the practice of law.  By now a Republican, Conger was elected Judge of the Wisconsin Circuit Court in 1870.  He was reelected in 1876 and served until his death.

Death and burial
Conger died in Janesville October 22, 1882.  He was interred in Oak Hill Cemetery.

Notes

References

Harmon S. Conger at Political Graveyard

1816 births
1882 deaths
People from Cortland County, New York
Politicians from Janesville, Wisconsin
New York (state) lawyers
Wisconsin Republicans
Wisconsin state court judges
Whig Party members of the United States House of Representatives from New York (state)
19th-century American politicians
19th-century American judges
19th-century American lawyers